Hester Grenville may refer to:
Hester Grenville, 1st Countess Temple (1690–1752), English noblewoman
Hester Pitt, Countess of Chatham (née Grenville, 1720–1803), wife of William Pitt the Elder
Hester Grenville, mother of Hester Pitt and wife of Richard Grenville
Hester Grenville (c. 1767–1847), niece of Hester Pitt and daughter of George Grenville